The Taifa of Menorca was a medieval Islamic taifa kingdom, which existed from 1228 until 1287, when the Crown of Aragon conquered it. It was ruled by the Arabs of the Banu Khazraj tribe.

List of Emirs

Hakamid dynasty
Abu Sa'id Utman: c. 1228/9?–1281
Abu 'Umar: 1281–1287

See also
 List of Sunni Muslim dynasties

1287 disestablishments in Europe
States and territories established in 1228
Menorca
History of Menorca